Les brasseurs du Nord (The Brewers of/from the North) is a brewery just north of Montreal, in Blainville, Quebec, Canada.

History
Founded in 1987 by three students at the UQAM (Laura Urtnowski, and brothers Bernard and Jean Morin), who paid their way through school selling home-made beer, and then decided to try their hand at establishing a commercial brewery. Thanks to a small loan, the company was established. The students loaded their first four kegs in the back of the family Subaru and went looking for their first client. They managed to convince four bars in Montreal to carry the brew, and the resulting surge in demand helped the company expand several times. The resulting company account for just over 1% of the total beer sales in the province of Quebec (their products are not sold outside Quebec).

The company was named after the Aurora Borealis, and the label features a polar bear above the word Boreale. It brewed the first amber style beer in Quebec. They currently brew six ale-type beers: Boréale Rousse (launched in 1988), Boréale Blonde (launched in 1990), Boréale Cuivrée, Boréale Noire, Boréale Dorée and Boréale Blanche and recently a new beer, Boreal IPA (launched in 2012). Current production is over 100,000 hL.

Products
The company produces seven main brands of beer. and a few others.

Environment
The company has recently taken a "green" approach to brewing, hiring engineers to evaluate the expansion of the plant on the surrounding forest. They also had mature trees trans-planted at the facility to help keep the environment healthy. They have incorporated several state of the art energy-saving technologies in the building. They supply bars and restaurants with glasses made from recycled plastic, and have also donated money to help study the effects of climate change on polar bears around Hudson Bay. The company recently changed its label material from metallic foil to paper.

See also
 Beer in Quebec
 Beer in Canada

References

Sources
 D'eer, Mario. (2003,2005) Atlas mondial de la bière, Edition révisée. Trécarré, p. 235.  
 official company website
 http://archives.radio-canada.ca/economie_affaires/consommation/clips/1359-8205/ 
 http://www.canoe.com/artdevivre/cuisine/article1/2006/12/13/2771294-ca.html 
 brief biography of the founders of the company 

Canadian beer brands
Beer brewing companies based in Quebec
Companies based in Quebec
Blainville, Quebec